Karl Myrthell Joseph (born September 8, 1993) is an American football strong safety who is a free agent. He played college football at West Virginia and was drafted by the Raiders in the first round of the 2016 NFL Draft. He has also played for the Cleveland Browns.

Early years
Joseph attended Edgewater High School in Orlando, Florida. He committed to West Virginia University to play college football.

College career
Joseph started all 13 games as a true freshman at West Virginia in 2012, recording 104 tackles, two interceptions, and one sack. He started all 12 games his sophomore year and had 68 tackles and one interception. He again started all 13 games as a junior in 2014, recording 92 tackles and one interception. Joseph started the first four games his senior year in 2015, before suffering a season-ending knee injury. At the time of the injury, he was leading the nation with five interceptions.

Professional career
Coming out of West Virginia, Joseph was projected by the majority of NFL draft experts and scouts to be a second or third round pick. He received an invitation to the NFL combine, but was unable to perform any physical drills due to a knee injury he suffered in October. On April 4, 2016, he was among 22 prospects who performed at West Virginia's pro day, that included Wendell Smallwood, K. J. Dillon, Nick Kwiatkoski, and Daryl Worley. He performed the bench press and met with coaches, team representatives, and scouts from all 32 NFL teams, that included Pittsburgh Steelers' head coach Mike Tomlin. Joseph was ranked the second best strong safety prospect in the draft by DraftScout.com and was ranked the seventh best defensive back prospect by Sports Illustrated.

The Oakland Raiders selected Joseph in the first round (14th overall) of the 2016 NFL Draft. Joseph was the first safety drafted in 2016.

Oakland Raiders

2016
On May 10, 2016, the Oakland Raiders signed Joseph to a fully guaranteed four-year, $11.88 million contract with a signing bonus of $6.84 million.

Joseph competed with veterans T. J. Carrie and Nate Allen throughout training camp for the vacant starting strong safety role after the departure of Larry Asante. Head coach Jack Del Rio named Joseph the backup strong safety to Nate Allen to begin the  season.

He made his professional regular season debut in the Oakland Raiders' season-opening 35–34 win at the New Orleans Saints. On September 25, 2016, Joseph made his first career start and recorded a season-high ten combined tackles in the Raiders' 17–10 victory at the Tennessee Titans. On October 9, 2016, he collected six combined tackles, defended a pass, and made his first career interception off of Philip Rivers during a 34–31 victory over the San Diego Chargers. During a Week 12 contest against the Houston Texans, Joseph recorded a season-high nine solo tackles in the Raiders' 27–20 victory. During a Week 13 matchup against the Buffalo Bills, Joseph collected four combined tackles, but left the game after suffering an apparent toe injury that would cause him to miss the last four games of the season (Weeks 14–17). He finished the season with 60 combined tackles (44 solo), six pass deflections, and intercepted one pass in 12 games and nine starts. He was named to the PFWA All-Rookie Team after a strong rookie season. Pro Football Focus gave him an overall grade of 75.5, ranking him 50th among all qualifying safeties in 2016. He also received a coverage grade of 79.6, which ranked 29th.

The Oakland Raiders received a playoff berth after finishing second in the AFC West with a 12–4 record. On January 7, 2017, Joseph started in his first career playoff game and recorded four solo tackles as the Raiders lost 14–27 to the Houston Texans in the AFC Wildcard game.

2017
He started the Oakland Raiders' season-opener at the Tennessee Titans and recorded a season-high nine combined tackles and a pass deflection during their 26–16 victory. The following week, Joseph recorded five combined tackles, his first career sack, and forced a fumble by New York Jets' quarterback Josh McCown, that he would recover to set up the Raiders' offense on an eventual touchdown scoring drive. They went on to defeat the Jets 45–20. On September 24, 2017, he collected a season-high eight solo tackles and assisted on a tackle in a 10–27 loss to the Washington Redskins. On October 19, 2017, Joseph recorded four combined tackles and a pass deflection, but exited the Raiders' 31–30 victory at the Kansas City Chiefs in the fourth quarter after sustaining an injury. He was sidelined for the Raiders' Week 8 loss to the Buffalo Bills due to a groin injury. In Week 14, Joseph made three solo tackles, deflected a pass, and intercepted a pass by Alex Smith during a 26–15 loss at the Kansas City Chiefs. On December 31, 2017, the Oakland Raiders fired head coach Jack Del Rio and finished third in the AFC West with a 6–10 record. He finished the  season with 79 combined tackles (58 solo), four pass deflections, an interception, and a sack in 15 games and 15 starts. Pro Football Focus gave Joseph an overall grade of 80.8, ranking him 35th among all qualified safeties in 2017.

2018
In Week 11 against the Arizona Cardinals, Joseph made his first interception of the season off quarterback Josh Rosen in a 23-21 Raiders win. He finished the season playing in 13 games with eight starts, recording 48 combined tackles, two sacks, two passes defensed, and one interception.
In the first eight weeks of the season, Joseph played only eleven snaps.  During the trade deadline, it was speculated that the Raiders would be moving on from Joseph.  Starting from week 11, Joseph's play improved and he finished the season as the Raiders' highest graded defender according to Pro Football Focus.
He received an overall grade of 74.5 from Pro Football Focus in 2018, which ranked as the 23rd highest grade among all safeties.

2019
On May 2, 2019, the Raiders declined the fifth-year option on Joseph's contract, making him a free agent in 2020. He was named a starting safety to start the 2019 season. 
In week 10 against the Los Angeles Chargers on Thursday Night Football, Joseph recorded an interception off Philip Rivers late in the fourth quarter which sealed a 26-24 win.  During the interception, Joseph injured his foot.
He started the first nine games before suffering a foot injury in Week 10. He was placed on injured reserve on November 9, 2019. He finished the season with three passes defensed, an interception, and 49 tackles, which was second on the team at the time.

Cleveland Browns
On April 13, 2020, Joseph signed a one-year contract with the Cleveland Browns. He was placed on the active/physically unable to perform list at the start of training camp on August 3, 2020, and activated from the list five days later. In Week 3 against the Washington Football Team, Joseph recorded his first interception as a Brown during the 30–24 win. He was placed on the reserve/COVID-19 list by the team on December 29, 2020, and activated on January 2, 2021.

In the Wild Card round of the playoffs against the Pittsburgh Steelers, Joseph recovered an errant snap by Steelers' center Maurkice Pouncey in the endzone for a Browns' touchdown during the 48–37 win.  
In the Divisional Round of the playoffs against the Kansas City Chiefs, Joseph intercepted a pass thrown by Chad Henne in the endzone for a touchback during the 22–17 loss.

Joseph became an unrestricted free agent following the 2020 season.

Las Vegas Raiders
Joseph signed with the Las Vegas Raiders on April 12, 2021. He was released on August 31, 2021.

Pittsburgh Steelers
Joseph was signed to the Pittsburgh Steelers practice squad on September 1, 2021. On October 4th, Joseph was promoted to the active roster. His contract expired when the teams season ended on January 16, 2022. Joseph re-signed with the Steelers on March 31, 2022.

On August 16, 2022, Joseph was placed on injured reserve with an ankle injury.

NFL career statistics

Personal life
Joseph is of Haitian descent.

References

External links
 Las Vegas Raiders profile
 West Virginia Mountaineers bio
 

1993 births
Living people
Players of American football from Orlando, Florida
American sportspeople of Haitian descent
American football safeties
Edgewater High School alumni
West Virginia Mountaineers football players
Oakland Raiders players
Cleveland Browns players
Las Vegas Raiders players
Pittsburgh Steelers players